Vladimir Leonidovich Kleiman (November 11, 1930 – April 7, 2014) was a Soviet and Russian scientist and designer in the field of rocketry. Hero of Socialist Labour (1975), winner of the Lenin Prize (1964) and the USSR State Prize (1980).

References

External links
 Герои страны

1930 births
2014 deaths
20th-century Russian engineers
21st-century Russian engineers
People from Yaysky District
Heroes of Socialist Labour
Lenin Prize winners
Recipients of the Order of Lenin
Recipients of the Order of the Red Banner of Labour
Recipients of the USSR State Prize

Rocket scientists
Russian aerospace engineers
Russian mechanical engineers
Soviet aerospace engineers
Soviet mechanical engineers